The Communauté de communes du Territoire Nord Picardie is a communauté de communes in the Somme département and in the Hauts-de-France région of France. It was formed on 1 January 2017 by the merger of the former Communauté de communes du Bernavillois, the Communauté de communes du Bocage et de l'Hallue and the Communauté de communes du Doullennais. On 1 January 2018 it lost 5 communes to the Communauté d'agglomération Amiens Métropole and the Communauté de communes du Val de Somme. It consists of 65 communes, and its seat is in Doullens. Its area is 537.7 km2, and its population was 31,096 in 2019.

Composition
The communauté de communes consists of the following 65 communes:

Agenville
Autheux
Authieule
Barly
Bavelincourt
Béalcourt
Beaucourt-sur-l'Hallue
Beaumetz
Beauquesne
Beauval
Béhencourt
Bernâtre
Bernaville
Berneuil
Boisbergues
Bonneville
Bouquemaison
Brévillers
Candas
Coisy
Contay
Conteville
Domesmont
Domléger-Longvillers
Doullens
Épécamps
Fieffes-Montrelet
Fienvillers
Flesselles
Fréchencourt
Frohen-sur-Authie
Gézaincourt
Gorges
Grouches-Luchuel
Hem-Hardinval
Heuzecourt
Hiermont
Humbercourt
Longuevillette
Lucheux
Maizicourt
Le Meillard
Mézerolles
Mirvaux
Molliens-au-Bois
Montigny-les-Jongleurs
Montigny-sur-l'Hallue
Montonvillers
Naours
Neuvillette
Occoches
Outrebois
Pierregot
Prouville
Rainneville
Remaisnil
Rubempré
Saint-Acheul
Saint-Gratien
Talmas
Terramesnil
Vadencourt
La Vicogne
Villers-Bocage
Wargnies

References

Territoire Nord Picardie
Territoire Nord Picardie